A smart fixture is an advanced test fixture which combines a fixture with sensors to collect data and provide feedback. They are a subset of cyber-physical systems. Sensors and/or instrumentation embedded in the fixture are connected to a programmable logic controller or computer which apply algorithms to determine if required criteria are met i.e. functional testing.

A smart fixture can be a manufacturing fixture or simply a test fixture. The smart aspect is fully realised in the use of the data collected via IIoT/ Industry 4.0. machine learning, artificial intelligence and other big data tools can be applied to perform real time analysis and predictive decision making to improve operational efficiencies.

Electronics
Circuit boards, are held in place and subjected to controlled electronic test signals.

Examples of fixtures:
 Uploading a software into a microcontroller and testing the functionality of the PCBA
 Checking the correct parameters of a LED light

See also 
 Device under test
 Bed of nails tester

References

SmartFixture of 6TL, by David Batet.
SmartFixture of Columbia
Smartfixture from Romex BV, by Peter van Oostrom (Dutch Language)

Unit testing
Tests